Ian Brennan (born June 15, 1966) is an American music producer, author and lecturer on violence prevention.

Brennan has authored six books, two on anger, Anger Antidotes (2011) and Hate-less (2014); a novella, Sister Maple Syrup Eyes (2015); and three on music, How Music Dies [or Lives] (2016), Silenced by Sound (2019), and Muse-Sick (2021).

Brennan travels in search of countries and languages whose music is under-represented internationally, making field recordings of musicians and producing albums of their work. He started out making nine albums of his own music, and hosting benefits, making live recordings and releasing compilation albums of local bands in San Francisco.

Of the albums he has produced, Tinariwen's Tassili (2011) won a Grammy Award for Best World Music Album and Zomba Prison Project (2015) was nominated; and Ramblin' Jack Elliott's I Stand Alone (2006) and Peter Case's Let Us Now Praise Sleepy John (2007) were nominated for Grammy Award for Best Traditional Folk Album.

Early life
Brennan was born in Oakland, California to James Brennan, a railroad engineer, and Marilyn Brennan, a nurse from a tiny town in eastern Kansas. He grew up on the Pleasant Hill border in the same suburban home his entire life. He and his older brother and sister have a mere two-and-one-half-year span between the three of them. This is due in part to his sister, who is the middle child, being born more than two months premature with Down syndrome.

At age five, he began playing drums and switched to guitar at age 6, which he taught himself to play.

Career

San Francisco Bay Area
At age 20, he self-released his first solo album and went on to produce eight more. He reflects now that he was his "own worst enemy" and made some of the "most horrible albums possible" due to his obsessive-compulsive, autocratic approach.

Beginning in 1996, for five years he hosted a free, mostly acoustic music show in a San Francisco laundromat. He would perform solo and feature a different local band each week. He documented the shows as field recordings and these resulted in three Unscrubbed compilation albums in 1997–1999.

Brennan also regularly organized benefit shows for social and/or political causes during this period with artists such as Merle Haggard and Kris Kristofferson. Most notably he presented Fugazi, Vic Chesnutt, and Sleater-Kinney for free in Mission Dolores Park to honor the 20th anniversary of Food Not Bombs in 2000, as well as staging Green Day and The Blind Boys of Alabama for free in front of the steps of San Francisco's City Hall on the Sunday before George W. Bush's election as President, also in 2000.

He received two Grammy Award nominations for producing albums in the traditional folk category (Ramblin' Jack Elliott's I Stand Alone in 2006, and Peter Case's Let Us Now Praise Sleepy John in 2007). The Ramblin' Jack record features Lucinda Williams and members of Wilco, X, Los Lobos, and the Red Hot Chili Peppers.

International work
In 2009, he and his wife, the Italian-Rwandan filmmaker, photographer, and author, Marilena Umuhoza Delli, began traveling the world in search of countries and languages that were underrepresented internationally. Amongst others, this has resulted in releases from Rwanda, Malawi, South Sudan, Cambodia, Djibouti, Tanzania, Romania, Comoros, Pakistan, Vietnam, from within Kibera in Nairobi, Kenya and most notably from inside Zomba Central Prison in Malawi.

In 2011, he won a Grammy Award for the Tuareg band, Tinariwen's Tassili album, which was recorded live in the southeast Algerian desert just months before the Arab Spring erupted and war swept through the area. The album also includes members of TV on the Radio, the Dirty Dozen Brass Band, and guitarist Nels Cline.

In 2015, he gained a nomination for Grammy Award for Best World Music Album for Zomba Prison Project, the story of which was covered around the world including on the front-page of The New York Times and by the television program 60 Minutes with Anderson Cooper reporting. The segment won the Emmy Award for Outstanding Feature Story and was nominated for two other Emmys.

Brennan has also produced many of filmmaker, John Waters' live comedy shows since 2001 at venues such as The Fillmore in San Francisco and the Royal Festival Hall in London, as well as at festivals including Coachella, Bumbershoot, and Bonnaroo. Brennan has created pairings for Waters such as with Jonathan Richman, evangelist Tammy Faye Bakker, Peaches, and Wanda Jackson.

Brennan has spoken about music at the Smithsonian Museum, the University of London, The New School (New York), the Berklee College of Music, Ca' Foscari University of Venice, the WOMEX conference, the Le Guess Who? festival in The Netherlands, Peter Gabriel's WOMAD Festival (UK), the Society for the Neuroscience of Creativity, the Audio Engineering Society (AES), and WOMADelaide in Australia.

Production style
Brennan is known for his fly on the wall style of production and is often compared to Alan Lomax. He states that relationships and emotion are what interests him, not technology. He often prefers to work with those who have no previous musical experience and hearing from historically persecuted populations. He advocates for embracing imperfection as a partner and prefers to record outdoors and 100% live, without any overdubs.

Mental health background
At age 20, in need of a way to support himself, he began working in locked psychiatric hospitals as a counselor. He continued to do so for another fifteen years in psychiatric emergency rooms in Oakland and Richmond, California.

In 1993 he was asked to develop a curriculum and teach his co-workers in verbal de-escalation at East Bay Hospital in Richmond. This request was based on his having regularly demonstrated skill at de-fusing emotionally charged and violent situations. Through word of mouth, he began teaching full-time at hospitals, clinics, jails and schools in the San Francisco Bay Area and greater California. This teaching eventually led him around the country and then the world, having now taught in Africa, Southeast Asia, Europe, Australia, and the Middle East, at such places as University of California, Berkeley, the Betty Ford Center, and the National Accademia of Science (Rome).

Political activism
Brennan has worked to establish a memorial for those who have died from homelessness in San Francisco. The installations were unanimously approved by the Board Of Supervisors, but later stalled due to opposition from the Mayors Office and the Chamber of Commerce. In the fall of 2019, Brennan produced a "sonic memorial" album featuring voices and songs from the homeless community of West Oakland.

Brennan wrote a piece in May 2019 for the Chicago Tribune criticizing the racist and misogynistic lyrics of The Rolling Stones', "Brown Sugar", and calling for the band to cease playing it live. In October 2021, the band announced that they were retiring the song from their performance repertoire. Brennan's piece was widely cited as a reference in this decision.

Writing
At age 19, Brennan's poetry was published for the first time in an anthology (Fineline Thunder) curated by his adult-school creative writing workshop instructor, Betty Solomon. He was published again that same year in the Berkeley poetry journal, Agape.

He has written about music for The Guardian, NPR, Guitar Player, Sound on Sound, Chicago Tribune, BOMB, Pollstar, Modern Drummer, American Songwriter, Talkhouse, Huck, Songlines, The Quietus, No Depression (magazine), The Vinyl District, Afropop Worldwide, Quincy Jones' Qwest TV, Fretboard Journal, SonicScoop, Perceptive Travel, Flood Magazine, Zero, and Tape Op.

In 2011, he published a book on anger, Anger Antidotes. A follow-up, Hate-less, was issued in 2014.

In 2015, his semi-autobiographical novella, Sister Maple Syrup Eyes, was published, after working on drafts of it for over 25 years. It deals with the aftermath of the sexual assault of a partner, a trauma he experienced at age 21. Readers+Writers journal praised it, "A beautiful book. Achingly beautiful." And Louder Than War states it is, "….alive with the energy of an eye-witness." Small Press Picks noted, "In vividly re-creating Kristian's personal journey, Brennan offers a layered and moving exploration of the truth…"

His fourth book was How Music Dies (or Lives): Field-recording and the Battle For Democracy in the Arts. In it he explores concerns related to the continuing domination of English language media across the planet, and details how recording technology can lead to more lifeless results as well as centralization of content. LargeHearted Boy calls it "…one of the most thought-provoking books on modern music that I have ever read."

His fifth book, Silenced by Sound: the Music Meritocracy Myth, was published in the fall of 2019.

In 2020, Brennan co-authored Negretta: Baci Razzisti with his wife, Marilena Umuhoza Delli. The book is based on Delli's life growing-up in Italy's most conservative region with an immigrant mother from Rwanda.

Brennan has hosted book events with the disability rights activist Judith E. Heumann (featured in the Academy Award nominated documentary Crip Camp); tech visionary Jaron Lanier; David Harrington (Kronos Quartet); feminist scholar Silvia Federici; Ted Hughes Award winning, deaf poet, Raymond Antrobus; and music producer Joe Boyd (Nick Drake, Billy Bragg, Toots and the Maytals).

His seventh book, Muse-Sick: a music manifesto in fifty-nine notes, was published by PM Press in October 2021.

Publications

Publications by Brennan
 Anger Antidotes: How Not to Lose Your S#&!. New York City: W. W. Norton & Company, 2011. .
 Hate-less: Violence Prevention & How To Make Friends With A F&#!ed Up World. Toy Gun Murder, 2014. .
 Sister Maple Syrup Eyes. New York City: Pleasure Boat Studio, 2015. . A novella.
 How Music Dies (or Lives): Field-recording and the Battle For Democracy in the Arts. New York City: Allworth Press, 2016. . With a foreword by Corin Tucker.
 Silenced by Sound: the Music Meritocracy Myth  PM Press, 2019 . With a foreword by Tunde Adebimpe.
Muse-Sick: a music manifesto in fifty-nine notes PM Press, 2021 . With a foreword by John Waters.

Publications with others
 Fineline Thunder: Work by the Devil Mountain Poets. Walnut Creek, CA: Devil Mountain Books, 1986. . With poems by Brennan and others.
 Negretta: Baci Razzisti. Rome, Italy: Red Star Press, 2020. . with Marilena Delli Umuhoza (Italian language work).

Discography

Albums by Brennan
 Ian Brennan (Toy Gun Murder, 1987)
 One Last Kiss (Toy Gun Murder, 1988)
 Twisting by the Pool (Toy Gun Murder, 1988)
 One Sided Stories, Ian Brennan and the Faith Healers (Toy Gun Murder, 1990)
 Stuff (Toy Gun Murder, 1992)
 Paperboy (Toy Gun Murder, 1994)
 Cheapskate (Toy Gun Murder, 1996)
 Teacher's Pet (Toy Gun Murder, 1998)
 Mail-Order Brides (Toy Gun Murder, 2000)
 Sometimes It Just Takes That Long: 1987–2015 (Independent Records Ltd [IRL], 2016)
 Silenced by Sound: the Music Meritocracy Myth, spoken-word release (PM Press, January 2021)

Compilation albums recorded and released by Brennan
Acoustic performances at Brainwash Laundromat in San Francisco recorded live by Brennan.
 Unscrubbed: Live From The Laundromat, various artists (Toy Gun Murder, 1997)
 Unscrubbed: Live From The Laundromat II, various artists (Toy Gun Murder, 1998) featuring Henry Kaiser (musician)
 Unscrubbed: Live From The Laundromat III, various artists (Toy Gun Murder, 1999) featuring Grandaddy

Singles produced by Brennan
 Why [the War]?, Yemen War Refugees (Toy Gun Murder, 2020) – Yemen
 Soccer (Summer 1988), The Good Ones (Anti-, September 2020)
 Albinism Unity (We Are Still Living In a Troubled World), Tanzania Albinism Collective (Six Degrees Records, June 2021)
 I'm So Tired of Evil, Malawi Mouse Boys (Toy Gun Murder, August 2021) – Malawi
 Death Can  Come at Any Time, fra fra (Glitterbeat Records, February 2022) - Ghana
Abnoy (Don't Call Me Names), Sheltered Workshop Singers (Toy Gun Murder Records, March 2022)
 The Smallest Country in the World (We Are Ancient), Comorian (Glitterbeat Records, June 2022) - Comoros
 In Memory of a Hungry Child, Malawi Mouse Boys (Toy Gun Murder Records, September 2022)
 Peace to All, Ustad Saami (Glitterbeat Records, September 2022) - Pakistan
 It's in the Book, John Waters (Sub Pop Records, December 2022) homage to 1950s comedian Johnny Standley
 I Look For You Everywhere, Comorian (Toy Gun Murder Records, January 2023)

Albums produced by Brennan
 I Stand Alone, Ramblin' Jack Elliott (Anti-, 2006)
 Let Us Now Praise Sleepy John, Peter Case (Yep Roc Records, 2007)
 Rain Machine, Rain Machine (Anti-, 2009)
 Kigali Y’ Izahabu, The Good Ones (Dead Oceans Records, 2010) – Rwanda
 Tassili, by Tinariwen (Anti-, 2011) – Mali/Algeria
 He Is #1, Malawi Mouse Boys (IRL, 2012) – Malawi
 Italia 1988–2012, Jovanotti (ATO Records, 2012)
 Trance Percussion Masters of South Sudan, Wayo (Riverboat, 2013) – Zande people
 South Sudan Street Survivors, General Paolino featuring Mama Celina (IRL, 2013) – South Sudan
 Little Copper Still, The Cedars (Clubhouse Records, 2013) – Scotland/South Africa/Portugal
 Lapwong (Freedom Fighters), Acholi Machon (IRL, 2014) – Acholi
 Dirt is Good, Malawi Mouse Boys (IRL, 2014)
 I Have No Everything Here, Zomba Prison Project (Six Degrees Records, 2015) – Malawi
 Survival Songs, Bob Forrest (Six Degrees Records, 2015) – Big Sur
 War is a Wound, Peace is a Scar, Hanoi Masters (Glitterbeat, 2015) – Vietnam
 Kibera Esbera [Kenya], West Bridge Band (Electric Cowbell Records, 2015) – Kibera, Nairobi, Kenya
 Rwanda is My Home, The Good Ones (IRL, 2015) – Rwanda
 Quaranta [40], Canzoniere Grecanico Salentino (Ponderosa Music & Art, 2015) – Apulia, Italy
 Like a Bird or Spirit, Not a Face, Sainkho Namtchylak (Ponderosa Music & Art, 2015) – Tuva; Brennan also plays on the album
 They Will Kill You, If You Cry, Khmer Rouge Survivors (Glitterbeat, 2016) – Cambodia
 Rough Romanian Soul, Zmei3 (Six Degrees Records, 2016) – Romania
 Forever Is 4 You, Malawi Mouse Boys (Omnivore Recordings, 2016)
 I Will Not Stop Singing, Zomba Prison Project (Six Degrees Records, 2016)
 Why Did We Stop Growing Tall?, Abatwa [The Pygmy] (Glitterbeat, 2017) – Twa people, Rwanda/Burundi
 White African Power, Tanzania Albinism Collective (Six Degrees Records, 2017) – Tanzania
 Make Trouble, John Waters (Third Man Records, 2017)
 Our Skin May Be Different, But Our Blood is the Same, Tanzania Albinism Collective (Six Degrees Records, 2018) – Tanzania
 Score for a film about Malawi without music from Malawi, Malawi Mouse Boys (Toy Gun Murder, 2018)
 God is not a terrorist, Ustad Saami (Glitterbeat Records, January 2019) – Pakistan
 Not a homeless person, just a person without a home, Homeless Oakland Heart (Electric Cowbell Records, October 2019)
 Rwanda, You Should Be Loved, The Good Ones (Anti-, November 2019)
 Funeral Songs, fra fra (Glitterbeat Records, April 2020) – Ghana
 Who You Calling Slow?, Sheltered Workshop Singers (Toy Gun Murder, September 2020)
 Pakistan is for the peaceful, Ustad Saami (Glitterbeat, October 2020) – Karachi
 I've Forgotten Now Who I Used to Be, Witch Camp [Ghana] (Six Degrees Records, March 2021)
 Prayer to Pasolini, John Waters (Sub Pop Records, April 2021) – recorded onsite in Italy
 We are an island, but we're not alone, Comorian (Glitterbeat Records, May 2021) – Comoros
 Sons of South Sudan, Acholi Machon (Good Deeds Music, July 2021) – South Sudan
 East Pakistan Sky, Ustad Saami (Glitterbeat Records, October 2021) - Pakistan
 A Lifetime Isn't Long Enough, War Women of Kosovo (Toy Gun Murder, February 2022) - Kosovo
 Rwanda...you see ghosts, I see sky, The Good Ones (Six Degrees Records, April 2022) - Rwanda
 Afar Ways, Yanna Momina (Glitterbeat Records, August 2022) - Djibouti
 The First Time I Wore Hearing Aids, Raymond Antrobus (Toy Gun Murder, September 2022)

Awards and nominations
 2006: Ramblin Jack Elliott's I Stand Alone nominated for a Grammy Award for Best Traditional Folk Album
 2007: Peter Case's Let Us Now Praise Sleepy John nominated for a Grammy Award for Best Traditional Folk Album
 2011: Tinariwen's Tassili won a Grammy Award for Best World Music Album
 2015: Zomba Prison Project's I Have No Everything Here nominated for a Grammy Award for Best World Music Album
 2017: Khmer Rouge Survivors' They Will Kill You, If You Cry nominated for a Songlines Music Award, Best Asian Album category
 2017: Brennan's How Music Dies (or Lives) nominated for Association for Recorded Sound Collections Award, Best Historical Research in Recorded Folk, Roots, or World Music category
 2020: Ustad Saami's God is not a terrorist nominated for a Songlines Music Award, Best Asian Album category
 2021: Ustad Saami's Pakistan is for the peaceful nominated for a Songlines Music Award, Best Asian Album category
 2022: Ustad Saami's east Pakistan sky won a Songlines Music Award, Best Asia & Pacific Album category

References

External links
 Brennan's artist website
 Non-violent Crisis Resolution
 

Living people
1966 births
People from Oakland, California
Grammy Award winners
Record producers from California
Ethnomusicologists
American music theorists
American writers about music
American audio engineers
Engineers from California
Musicians from Oakland, California